White Oak is a census-designated place and an unincorporated area in Montgomery County, Maryland, United States. It had a population of 16,347 in 2020.

White Oak was known for its Naval Ordnance Laboratory, which was closed in 1994. The headquarters of the Food and Drug Administration now occupies the property, which has been renamed the Federal Research Center at White Oak. 
According to the United States Census Bureau, the locality has a total area of  square miles ( km), all land.

White Oak is a diverse neighborhood. The main area of White Oak is from Lockwood Drive starting from New Hampshire Avenue (MD 650) towards Stewart Lane, crossing Columbia Pike (U.S. 29).

Geography
As an unincorporated area, White Oak's boundaries are not officially defined by either a municipal government or by the government of Montgomery County. Boundaries for the White Oak census-designated place have been established by the United States Census Bureau, while the United States Geological Survey recognizes White Oak to be a populated place located at  (39.039832,  –76.993032). Many of its residents consider themselves to be residents of the White Oak neighborhood of Silver Spring, similar to how large cities have different neighborhoods within their borders.

Quaint Acres
"Quaint Acres" is a subdivision of White Oak just north of modern Route 29 and west of New Hampshire Avenue.  The subdivision was named after the house  of Altus Lacy Quaintance, a State Entomologist of Maryland who worked at the Maryland Agricultural College and later at the USDA.

On 26 May 1945, a TB-25D 'Mitchell' bomber en route from Biloxi to Bolling Field crashed near Quaint Acres, killing all four aboard.  The bomber was piloted by Dudley M. Outcalt  who flew in the 94th Aero Squadron during World War I.

After the war, the Quaint Acres subdivision was home to famed naturalist Rachel Carson and where she wrote Silent Spring in 1962, the book that facilitated the ban of the pesticide DDT in the United States.  She built the ranch house at 11701 Berwick Rd. in 1956, and lived there until her death in 1964.  The house is a National Historic Landmark, but not open to the public.

Quaint Acres was also the Washington area home to Margaret Chase Smith, the first woman to be elected to both the U.S. House and the Senate.

Demographics

2020 census

Note: the US Census treats Hispanic/Latino as an ethnic category. This table excludes Latinos from the racial categories and assigns them to a separate category. Hispanics/Latinos can be of any race.

2010 Census
As of the census of 2010, there were  people,  households, and  families residing in the White Oak area. The population density was  people per square mile (/km). The racial makeup of the area was 27.7% White, 49.4% African American, 0.4% Native American, 8.9% Asian, 0.1% Pacific Islander, 9.1% from other races, and 4.5% from two or more races. Hispanic or Latino of any race were 18.4% of the population. 6% of White Oak's residents were White Hispanics/Latinos, 21.6% were Hispanics/Latinos from some other race, and 1.5% were Afro-Latinos. 21.6% of the population were non-Hispanic whites, 47.8% were non-Hispanic blacks, and 8.9% were non-Hispanic Asians.

The largest ancestry groups by race, according to current estimates, were:

 53.2% African, Afro-Caribbean, or African American (12.5% other Sub-Saharan African, 4.1% Ethiopian, 1.8% Haitian, 1.4% Jamaican, 0.7% Kenyan)
 17.6% White (3.2% German, 2.9% American, 2.4% English, 2.3% Irish, 1.6% Italian, 0.9% Polish)
 19.1% Hispanic or Latino (9.4% Salvadoran, 2.69% Dominican, 1.38% Guatemalan, 1.27% Mexican, 1.26% Puerto Rican)
 7.1% Asian (2.49% Vietnamese, 1.66% Korean, 1.11% Indian, 0.83% Chinese)

White Oak is home to a large population Orthodox and Conservative Jews. The Silver Spring Eruv Association includes parts of White Oak and the nearby neighborhoods of Kemp Mill and Colesville. An earlier eruv existed around the White Oak Apartments, until the larger eruv was constructed. White Oak is home to an Orthodox synagogue, the Southeast Hebrew Congregation. Southeast Hebrew was originally founded by Orthodox Eastern European immigrants in 1909 on Capitol Hill in Washington, D.C. Many Jews began to move out of Southeast Washington beginning in the 1930s and Southeast Hebrew was relocated to White Oak in 1971. Between 1965 and 2011, White Oak was home to Shaare Tefila Congregation, a Conservative synagogue. Shaare Tefila was originally founded in Riggs Park, a historically Jewish neighborhood in Washington, D.C once known as DC's "Little Tel Aviv." Founded in 1951, Shaare Tefila was relocated to White Oak in 1965. In 2011, Shaare Tefila was relocated again, moving to Olney where many young members now reside.

Education
Depending on how White Oak is geographically defined, students attend Cresthaven, Jackson Road and Burnt Mills Elementary Schools, which feed into White Oak and Francis Scott Key Middle School. Eighth-grade students have the option of choosing between the three Northeast Consortium schools, Blake High School, Paint Branch High School, and Springbrook High School.

Springbrook is located in the White Oak CDP.

External links

References

 
Census-designated places in Maryland
Census-designated places in Montgomery County, Maryland
Conservative Judaism in Maryland
Jews and Judaism in Silver Spring, Maryland
Orthodox Jewish communities
Orthodox Judaism in Maryland